Excalibur BBS was a Windows-based GUI BBS software developed by Excalibur Communications. Released in 1993, it has not been supported since 1999, when Excalibur Communications ceased operations.

Client Software 
Users connected to the BBS by modem or over a TCP/IP connection with the Excalibur Client.  For its time, the client provided a rich graphical environment allowing users access to instant messaging, games, music, message boards, and web like hyperlinked navigation screens. Excalibur provided the platform for add on functions called plugins. 

These plugins included games with/without animation/sound and expanded functions for file searches, local and Internet E-Mail, Fido net, Who's on, chat, change handle/password, edit your account info, etc.  Some systems used WAV files for background music incorporating a "jukebox" like interface with multiple music choices. Others used very clever screen changes to provide different degrees of visual input. 

Due to programming limitations, Excalibur BBS does not work properly on Windows XP or newer.

The original program was written in Borland C++ by Tim Robinson.

External links 
  Excalibur's Entry at the BBS Software Directory

Bulletin board system software